Mount Brunswick (officially Brunswick Mountain), is a summit in the Britannia Range of the North Shore Mountains on the Howe Sound side of the latter range. The mountain is located just northwest of the village of Lions Bay and is the namesake of Brunswick Beach, a locality on the Howe Sound shoreline below. Brunswick is the highest peak of the North Shore Mountains.

Name origin
Brunswick was, like other names in the Howe Sound area, named in 1859 by Captain Richards in association with the Battle of the Glorious First of June in 1794. , 74 guns, 1,836 tons, built at Deptford, 1790, was commanded by Captain John Harvey who lost a limb in the conflict.  Also in the area is Mount Harvey, also named for the captain, and nearby is Hutt Island, which was named for Captain John Hutt who also lost a limb and commanded  in the battle.

References

External links
 Hiking route | Outdoor Vancouver

North Shore Mountains
One-thousanders of British Columbia